Cecil Calvert may refer to:

 Cecil Calvert, 2nd Baron Baltimore (1605–1675), first proprietor of Maryland
 Cecil Calvert (politician), Unionist politician in Northern Ireland